Working With Walt was a music group formed in the 1980s, and based in Dunedin, New Zealand.

Working With Walt disbanded sometime by the late 1980s with Jan Hellriegel going on to a solo music career, and David Wood helping form Straitjacket Fits.

Band members
Rob Hellriegel (guitar, vocals and backing vocals)
Jan Hellriegel (piano, vocals and backing vocals)
Mark Petersen (guitar and backing vocals)
David Wood (bass guitar)
Neil Moorhouse (drums).

Discography

References

New Zealand musical groups
Dunedin Sound musical groups